There are several entries linked with the family name of Querini Stampalia:

Fondazione Querini Stampalia, a cultural institution in Venice, Italy
Pinacoteca Querini Stampalia, an art collection and museum in Venice, Italy
Astypalaia or Stampalia, a Greek island where the name Querini Stampalia originated

See also  
 Quirinus (disambiguation)